Sarah Helen Parcak is an American archaeologist and Egyptologist, who has used satellite imagery to identify potential archaeological sites in Egypt, Rome and elsewhere in the former Roman Empire. She is a professor of Anthropology and director of the Laboratory for Global Observation at the University of Alabama at Birmingham. In partnership with her husband, Greg Mumford, she directs survey and excavation projects in the Faiyum, Sinai, and Egypt's East Delta.

Education
Parcak was born in Bangor, Maine, and received her bachelor's degree in Egyptology and Archaeological Studies from Yale University in 2001, and her Ph.D. from the University of Cambridge. She is a professor of Anthropology at the University of Alabama at Birmingham (UAB); prior to that she was a teacher of Egyptian art and history at the University of Wales, Swansea.

During her undergraduate studies at Yale University, Parcak participated in her first of many digs in Egypt as well as a remote sensing course.

Career

From 2003 to 2004, Parcak used satellite images and surface surveys to “discover” 17 new pyramids and sites of archaeological interest, some dating back to 3,000 B.C. The pyramids have never been verified. Parcak's work consists of trying to find minute differences in topography, geology, and plant life to explore sites from a variety of cultures, although Egypt is her specialty. Satellites recording infrared wavelengths are able to distinguish differentiations in plant's chlorophyll, which can distinguish the less healthy plants that grow over buried structures. 

In partnership with her husband, Dr. Greg Mumford, she directs Survey and Excavation Projects in the Fayoum, Sinai, and Egypt's East Delta. They used satellite imagery to look for water sources and archaeological sites. According to Parcak, this approach reduces the time and cost for determining archaeological sites compared to surface detection.

In 2007, she founded the Laboratory for Global Observation at the University of Alabama at Birmingham.

In 2009, satellite imagery was used to find holes in the ground as evidence of how looting had escalated in Egypt.

In 2011 a BBC news report stated that she had "discovered" 17 previously unknown pyramids in Egypt as well as more than 1,000 tombs and 3,000 settlements. The Minister of State for Antiquities, Dr. Zahi Hawass, criticized the report, saying that this was "not accurate" and the BBC apologized. None of the 17 pyramids Parcak claimed to have discovered have ever been found. The Egyptian government decided to "develop a nationwide satellite imagery project to monitor archaeological sites from space and protect them from looting and illegal house construction and other encroachments.". The Egyptian National Authority for Remote Sensing and Space Sciences does the same thing.

In 2015, she won the $1 million TED Prize for 2016.

In 2016, she was the recipient of Smithsonian magazine's American Ingenuity Award in the History category. The same year, satellite images from Parcak and her team claimed to have identified the second-known Viking site in North America, located in Newfoundland. Upon subsequent ground investigation, it turned out not to be a Viking site or of any archeological significance. Her team also identified a large ceremonial platform in Petra and worked on satellite mapping the whole of Peru for the crowdsourcing project called GlobalXplorer. 

In 2020, she was awarded a John Simon Guggenheim Memorial Foundation 2020 Fellowship.

Documentaries
In May 2011, the BBC aired a documentary, Egypt's Lost Cities, describing BBC-sponsored research carried out by Parcak's UAB team for over a year using infra-red satellite imaging from commercial and NASA satellites. The programme discussed the research and showed Parcak in Egypt looking for physical evidence. The UAB team announced that they had "discovered" 17 pyramids, more than 1,000 tombs and 3,000 ancient settlements outside Sa el-Hagar, Egypt. However, the Minister of State for Antiquities, Zahi Hawass, was critical of the announcement and said: "This is completely wrong information. Any archeologist will deny this completely".

In May 2012, she was the subject of a half-hour program on CNN's The Next List which  profiles innovators "who are setting trends and making strides in various fields."

She was the focus of "Rome's Lost Empire", a TV documentary by Dan Snow, first shown on BBC One on 9 December 2012. She identified possible sites in Romania, Nabataea, Tunisia, and Italy, including the arena at Portus, the lighthouse and a canal to Rome beside the river Tiber.

A BBC co-production with PBS, NOVA/WGBH Boston and French Television, Vikings Unearthed (first broadcast April 4, 2016) documented her use of satellite imagery to detect possible remains of a Norse / Viking presence at Point Rosee, Newfoundland. In 2015, Parcak stated that remains could likely be a "turf wall and roasted bog" iron ore; however, an  excavation conducted in 2016 proved that she was wrong and that the "turf wall and accumulation of bog iron ore" were actually the results of natural processes.

Publications
In 2009, her book Satellite Remote Sensing for Archaeology was published by Routledge, describing the methodology of satellite archaeology. A review in Antiquity described it as focusing "more on technical methodology than interpretation and analysis," described Parcak's work as, "written in a lively style that makes a highly technical subject accessible to a general audience," and concluded that it was "a good introduction for undergraduate students of archaeology, anthropology and geography." 

She published Archaeology from Space: How the Future Shapes Our Past in July 2019 which won the Archaeological Institute of America Felicia A. Holton Book Award in 2022.

Controversies
In September 2020, Parcak's employer, the University of Alabama at Birmingham, issued a statement saying that tweets by Parcak aimed toward supporters of then-president Donald Trump following the death of Supreme Court Justice Ruth Bader Ginsburg showed poor judgement and did not reflect the opinions of the university. 

After Rush Limbaugh's death in 2021, Parcak tweeted that she hoped Limbaugh suffered until his last breath. The tweet is protected under the first amendment according to the ACLU of University of Alabama in spite of calls to terminate her position as a professor.

References

External links
 FOX News coverage of Dr. Parcak's work
''Egypt: What Lies beneath" – BBC Documentary about Parcak's work
 Interview with author
 
http://www.artofcounting.com/2011/05/26/seriously-did-zahi-hawass-just-spank-sarah-parcak/
TED Radio Hour Episode on NPR

1979 births
Living people
Alumni of Trinity College, Cambridge
American Egyptologists
People from Bangor, Maine
People from Birmingham, Alabama
University of Alabama at Birmingham people
Yale University alumni
American women archaeologists
Remote sensing archaeologists
21st-century American archaeologists
21st-century American women writers
American women historians
Historians from Maine